Sporty may refer to:

Sportsmanship
 Sporty, Australian radio program
Sporty, stage name of Øystein Andersen, drummer in the Norwegian rock band Wig Wam
"Sporty Spice", stage name of Melanie C,  of the Spice Girls music group
Sporty Thievz, an American hip-hop group